In 2013, the foremost competition in athletics was the 2013 World Championships in Athletics in Moscow. The International Association of Athletics Federations will hold two other global level competitions this year: the 2013 IAAF World Cross Country Championships and the 2013 World Youth Championships in Athletics. The IAAF World Cross Country Championships will return after its move to a biennial format.

The Diamond League enters its fourth year as the foremost seasonal track and field series.

Major events

World

World Championships
World Cross Country Championships
Diamond League
World Youth Championships
World Mountain Running Championships
IPC Athletics World Championships
Summer Universiade
Gymnasiade
World Military Cross Country Championships
IAU 100km World Championships
IAU 24 Hour World Championships
World Police and Fire Games

Regional

European Indoor Championships
European Team Championships
European U23 Championships
European Junior Championships
European Cross Country Championships
European Mountain Running Championships
European Cup Winter Throwing
European Cup Race Walking
European Cup 10000m
European Cup Combined Events
IAU 100 km European Championships
Games of the Small States of Europe
European Youth Olympic Festival
Mediterranean Games
Jeux de la Francophonie
Balkan Games
Asian Athletics Championships
Asian Race Walking Championships
Asian Cross Country Championships
Asian Youth Games
Arab Championships
East Asian Games
Southeast Asian Games
Islamic Solidarity Games
African Junior Championships
African Youth Championships
African Race Walking Championships
African Combined Events Championships
Oceania Athletics Championships
Island Games
Maccabiah Games
Bolivarian Games
CARIFTA Games
Central American and Caribbean Championships
Central American Championships
Central American Games
NACAC Cross Country Championships
Pan American Race Walking Cup
Pan American Combined Events Cup
Pan American Junior Championships
South American Athletics Championships
South American Cross Country Championships
South American Junior Championships

National
Canada Summer Games
Chinese National Games
German Championships
Italian Championships
Italian Indoor Championships
Japanese Championships
USA Track and Field Championships

Marathons
 Tokyo Marathon
 Boston Marathon
 London Marathon
 Berlin Marathon
 Chicago Marathon
 New York City Marathon

Season's bests

 Tyson Gay, with 9.75 seconds, had a faster 100 m in 2013, but was disqualified due to doping.
 Bernard Koech, with 58:41 minutes, had a faster half marathon time but this was set on an aided San Diego course which was not eligible for record purposes.
 Priscah Jeptoo, with 65:45 minutes, had a faster half marathon time but this was set on an aided course at the Great North Run which was not eligible for record purposes.

References

Season's best lists
Rorick, Jim (2013-10-22). 2013 World Comprehensive List - Men. Track and Field News. Retrieved on 2015-02-07.
Rorick, Jim (2013-10-22). 2013 World Comprehensive List - Women. Track and Field News. Retrieved on 2015-02-07.

 
2013
Athletics